BJL or bjl may refer to:

 Bangladesh Jatiya League, a dissolved political party in Bangladesh
 Brynmor Jones Library, the main library at the University of Hull
 BJL, the IATA code for Banjul International Airport, the Gambia
 bjl, the ISO 639-3 code for Bulu language (Oceanic), Papua New Guinea